Charles Claude Dauphin or Dofin, called in Italian Delfino (1615/1620 – 1677), a French painter of historical subjects and portraits, was the son of Olivier Dauphin.

Biography
He was born in Nancy, Lorraine. By about 1640, he had joined in Paris the studio of Simon Vouet. There he works alongside F. Tortebat and  M. Dorigny. In 1647, he married in Paris. When Vouet died in 1649, his studio dispersed. Dauphin went to Turin about the year 1652, and worked there for the Prince of Carignano. He was also employed in local churches. In the church of San Carlo is an altar-piece by him, described by Lanzi as a most ludicrous composition. He died in 1677 in Turin.

References

Attribution:
 
 A. Cifani, F. Monetti, La pala dell’altare dell’Accademia di san Luca, capolavoro di Carle Dauphin, in: Arte e Artisti nel Piemonte del ‘600. Nuove scoperte e nuovi orientamenti, Torino 1990, pp. 22-28;
 A. Cifani, F. Monetti, Picturae miraculum: un capolavoro ritrovato. Contributi per Carle Dauphin, altri inediti e nuovi documenti, in  “Arte Cristiana”, Gennaio-Febbraio 1998, n. 784, volume LXXXXVI, pp. 61–66;
 Scheda “Charles Dauphin, a cura di Arabella Cifani, in: Galleria Giamblanco dipinti antichi. Pittura italiana dal seicento al settecento venti anni di attività, Torino 2013, pp. 18–22, ivi bibliografia ulteriore.

Year of birth unknown
1677 deaths
17th-century French painters
French male painters
17th-century Italian painters
Italian male painters
Painters from Turin
Year of birth uncertain
Artists from Nancy, France